The 1934 New Hampshire Wildcats football team was an American football team that represented the University of New Hampshire as a member of the New England Conference during the 1934 college football season. In its 19th season under head coach William "Butch" Cowell, the team played its home games in Durham, New Hampshire, at Memorial Field. The team compiled a 3–4–2 record, being outscored by their opponents 89–148, while going undefeated at home, registering two wins and two ties in Durham.

Schedule

The game against Saint Anselm was the third-ever meeting between the two programs; their prior games had been in 1894 (won by Saint Anselm) and in 1898 (won by New Hampshire). New Hampshire's field goal in the Harvard game was the only time the Wildcats scored against the Crimson in seven games played from 1929 to 1939, as Harvard outscored New Hampshire by a total of 282–3 in those contests. New Hampshire and Dartmouth would not meet again until 1956.

Notes

References

New Hampshire
New Hampshire Wildcats football seasons
New Hampshire Wildcats football